Kitts may refer to:

Saint Kitts, an island in the West Indies
Saint Kitts and Nevis, an island nation in the West Indies
Kitts (surname)
HMS St. Kitts (D18), a Battle-class destroyer of the Royal Navy (RN)

See also
Kitts Green, area of Birmingham, England
Kitts Hill, Ohio, USA
Kitts Hummock, Delaware, USA
Kitt (disambiguation)